Magdalena Sánchez (born Puerto Cabello, Carabobo, Venezuela April 9, 1915; died Caracas, August 18, 2005) was a Venezuelan singer, better known as the Queen of the Venezuelan song.

See also 
Venezuelan music

References 
  Magdalena Sánchez at Glorias del Folklore foundation

1915 births
2005 deaths
People from Puerto Cabello
20th-century Venezuelan women singers
Venezuelan folk singers